The Perry–Robertson formula is a mathematical formula which is able to produce a good approximation of buckling loads in long slender columns or struts, and is the basis for the buckling formulation adopted in EN 1993.  
The formula in question can be expressed in the following form:

with 

where:
  is the average longitudinal stress in the beam's cross section
  is the material's elastic limit
  is the average tension measured in the cross section which correspond to the beam's Euler load
  the amplitude of the initial geometrical imperfection
  distance from the cross section's centroid to the section's most stressed fiber
  the section's radius of gyration

Robertson then proposed that , where  represents the beam's slenderness.

References

Elasticity (physics)